Musa beccarii is a species of wild banana (genus Musa), found in Malaysia, in Sabah (in the northern part of the island of Borneo). It is placed in section Callimusa (now including the former section Australimusa). The flower bud is narrow, bright scarlet with green-tipped bracts. The fruit is green and thin.  The species is named after Italian naturalist Odoardo Beccari.

It includes two subspecies, Musa beccarii subsp. beccarii (the autonym) and Musa beccarii subsp. hottana Häkkinen. The whole DNA genome has been assembled and the genes identified, showing that the 9 chromosome pairs are larger than in other Musa species, and adding to the diversity of genes known in the genus.

References

bukensis
Endemic flora of Borneo
Flora of Sabah
Plants described in 1960